XHTLAX-FM is a regional Mexican radio station that serves the area around Tlaxcala, Tlaxcala. It is branded as Radio Altiplano.

It is part of CORACYT, the radio and television organization of Tlaxcala, along with Tlaxcala Televisión, XETT-AM 1430 in Tlaxcala and XHCAL-FM 94.3 Calpulalpan.

History
Radio Altiplano signed on March 11, 1986, under an agreement made between the state government and IMER. IMER exited the partnership in 1991 due to budget cuts during the government of Carlos Salinas de Gortari. However, the concession history for Radio Altiplano was only beginning in 1991, as that year, the SCT made available 96.5 MHz in Tlaxcala with the XHTLAX-FM callsign. Radio Altiplano FM, S.A. de C.V., would receive the concession on October 21, 1994.

References

Radio stations in Tlaxcala
Mass media in Tlaxcala City
Public radio in Mexico